Bourgs sur Colagne is a commune in the department of Lozère, southern France. The municipality was established on 1 January 2016 by merger of the former communes of Le Monastier-Pin-Moriès and Chirac.

Population

See also 
Communes of the Lozère department

References 

Communes of Lozère
Populated places established in 2016
2016 establishments in France